AdventHealth University (AHU) is a Seventh-day Adventist institution specializing in healthcare education that is located in Orlando, Florida; Denver, Colorado; and online. It is associated with AdventHealth, which is operated by the Seventh-day Adventist Church. It is a part of the Seventh-day Adventist education system, the world's second largest Christian school system. The physical facilities are located next to AdventHealth Orlando and Centura Health in Denver. The university offers over 20 undergraduate and graduate degrees from associate to doctorate level, including online and post-baccalaureate certificates.

History
In 1913, Florida Hospital a Registered Nursing program was established by what is now Florida Hospital Medical Center (FHMC) and operated for 70 years as a three-year hospital-based nursing training program. Southern Missionary College in Collegedale, Tennessee, would send its "pre-nursing" students to Orlando for clinical experience. In 1983, a two-year Associate Degree in Nursing education program was begun at FHMC under the sponsorship of Southern College. In August 2012, it was renamed the Adventist University of Health Sciences.

In 1988, Tom Werner, then president of Florida Hospital, called and asked Dr. Robert Williams, then President of Kettering College of Medical Arts, and Dr. Don Sahly, President of SAU, to conduct a study to see whether Florida Hospital should start its own college. Their report concluded that it would be to the advantage of the hospital to start its own college. The planned outcome would be to gather the programs the hospital was presently doing in sponsorship with SAU and its hospital-based programs and bring them together into a two-year college institution.

In 1990, Werner approached Dr. David Greenlaw, a Chaplain at Florida Hospital at the time, and asked him to complete a feasibility study regarding opening a college. Using research he gathered with the help of outside consultants, Dr. Greenlaw recommended that Florida Hospital start their own college. Eventually, Dr. Greenlaw was asked to establish and direct the new institution, becoming AHU's Founder, CEO, and first President. Dr. Robert Williams joined Dr. Greenlaw and served as the college's first academic dean.

Florida Hospital College of Health Sciences, 1992 – 2012 
The school opened on August 24, 1992, under the name Florida Hospital College of Health Sciences (FHCHS) with 26 faculty members, full- and part-time, and 243 students on the first day of registration. Formal radiographic education began on the FHMC campus in 1962 and was transferred to FHCHS in 1992 with the school's opening with the approval of the Committee on Allied Health Education and Accreditation of the American Medical Association, and is accredited today by its successor, the Joint Review Committee on Education in Radiological Technology. The diagnostic medical sonography program, which was established by FHMC in 1988, is accredited by the Commission on Accreditation of Allied Health Education Programs.

The nursing program from Florida Hospital's campus was moved to the new college, where it received accreditation from SACSCOC as well as recognition by the National League for Nursing. These programs were augmented by programs in radiation therapy to form the college's first four curriculum offerings, which were associate-level degrees in nursing, radiation therapy, sonography, and radiography.

In 1998, SACSCOC granted the school level II accreditation and AHU headed into its second major era as a baccalaureate degree granting institution. During that same year the college added an Occupational Therapy Assistant (OTA) A.S. degree followed by the school's first bachelor's program, a B.S. degree in nursing. AHU later added two more associate degrees, one in pre-professional studies (2000) and the other in nuclear medicine (2002).

In 2008, the school received level III accreditation by SACSCOC to offer master's degrees. Nurse anesthesia was introduced as the university's first graduate program. The program is accredited by the Council on Accreditation of Nurse Anesthesia Educational Programs (COA).

In 2011, AHU introduced its second graduate degree, a Master of Occupational Therapy (M.O.T.). AHU's OT programs are accredited by the Accreditation Council for Occupational Therapy Education (ACOTE) of the American Occupational Therapy Association (AOTA).

In 2011, a new generic bachelor's in nursing degree was introduced and the A.S. nursing program was phased out. The following year the A.S degree in nuclear medicine also transitioned to a B.S. after AHU had been selected by the Society of Nuclear Medicine and Molecular Imaging (SNMMI) to serve as a pilot program in 2010. In November 2013, the program received the maximum 7-year accreditation from the Joint Review Committee on Educational Programs in Nuclear Medicine Technology (JRCNMT).

Addition of AHU Online 
In 2001, AHU received accreditation to offer distance degrees from SACSCOC. The first program offered in an entirely off-campus modality was a radiography B.S. completion degree.

A B.S. completion degree in nursing was added to the online line-up followed by a third B.S. completion program in diagnostic medical sonography in 2007. In 2015, AHU Online introduced an Executive Master of Healthcare Administration (EMHA).

AHU Denver 
Around 2008, an opportunity arose in Denver, Colorado. Adventist Health System had four hospitals in the Denver area where they had been struggling to find qualified, mission-oriented healthcare providers. When the leaders of these institutions became aware of FHCHS and its ability to deliver distance education, they invited college administrators to offer classes in Denver. That initial inquiry led the college to live-interactive video broadcast education. By 2009, equipment was purchased and installed on campus in Orlando and at a site offered by Porter Adventist Hospital in Denver.

With the approval of the Colorado Board of Education to offer degrees, the first students began nursing classes at the Denver site by the end of that year. In 2011, a radiography degree was added to the Denver programs and sonography courses were offered the next year.

Name changes 
The original name of the university was Florida Hospital College of Health Sciences. The name was changed to the Adventist University of Health Sciences in August 2012. The new Adventist name reflected both the faith-based origins within the Seventh-day Adventist higher education mission and the institution's connection to AHS, was not limited to the Central Florida region, and served as a more meaningful name for the Denver community. In 2018, the university announced that it would be changing its name to AdventHealth University in conjunction with Adventist Health Systems change to AdventHealth.

Adventist University of Health Sciences, 2012 – 2018 
AHU continued to add new graduate degrees to its offerings with a master's degree in healthcare administration in 2013 and a master's degree in physician assistant studies in 2015. That same year a B.S. in conductive education program was added, making AHU the first healthcare university in the U.S. to offer one. followed by a B.S. in Healthcare Administration

In March 2015, President Dr. Greenlaw introduced Edwin I. Hernández, Ph.D. as the new provost. AHU launched an advanced medical assistant associate degree program in 2016. On July 31, 2017, Dr. Greenlaw retired as president and the university's provost, Dr. Hernández, was appointed by the board of trustees to serve as the university's next president. He began his new role on August 1, 2017. In April 2018, Sandra Dunbar, D.P.A, OTR/L, FAOTA, was announced as AHU's new provost. She began her role officially on July 2, 2018.

AdventHealth University, 2018 - Present 
The university announced its intention to rebrand as AdventHealth University on August 15, 2018. The university expected to complete the transition by March 2019. In 2022, a new health tech lab was opened by Full Sail University at their Winter Park, FL location creating a partnership to merge access to health care industry experts and emerging technologies.

Academics 
AHU is accredited by the Southern Association of Colleges and Schools. Hospitals used by the college for clinical experiences are accredited by the Joint Commission.

AHU is organized into eight departments:
 Department of Healthcare Administration
 Department of Health and Biomedical Sciences
 Department of Imaging Sciences
 Department of Nurse Anesthesia
 Department of Nursing
 Department of Occupational Therapy
 Department of Physical Therapy
 Department of Physician Assistant

Campus

Campus Center Building 
In 2006, the 64,000 square-foot Campus Center building opened, adding many classrooms, labs, offices for academic departments and administration, an expanded bookstore, the NESS Café, and the Student Success Center. The new building also houses the chapel, just off the main entrance of the center, that celebrates AHU's Christian mission.

AHU's Welcome Center, which is where visitors check in, is located in the Campus Center lobby as well as the Registrar's office and the entrance to the campus bookstore and NESS Cafe.

Nursing Building 
The Nursing building was completed in 1996 to house the Nursing programs and skills labs, classrooms, computer labs, the Learning Resources Center, a 90-seat amphitheater, and offices.

General Education Building 
The General Education building, which served the Florida Hospital community for many years as a church and religions education center, has been completely renovated to serve as the location for the R.A. Williams Library, the Writing Center, administrative offices, science labs, a classroom, and Pre-Professional/Education offices.

Graduate Building 
In 2012, AHU broke ground on the planned 60,000 square-foot Graduate Building dedicated in 2014. The Graduate Building houses all current and proposed graduate programs. It also contains a 350-seat auditorium, the Dr. Greenlaw Conference Center, and the Simulation Center labs.

Garden of Miracles 
On the same day the Graduate Building was dedicated, AHU also introduced its Garden of Miracles. The Seven paths leading to seven panels of glass that tower fourteen feet above the ground. Each panel features a stylized depiction of one of the miracles performed by Jesus. The selected miracles represent paths to wholeness, usefulness, hope, peace, faith, restoration, and life.

Maurizio Maso was the lead architect on the project and Maurice Casa the artist. Design, construction and installation for the Garden were generously donated by HuntonBrady Architects, Brasfield & Gorrie, BBM Structural Engineers, Bellommo-Herbert, A GAI company, Poulos & Bennett, and TLF Engineering for Architecture.

Andersen House 
In 1995, a home on the campus was remodeled to provide offices for Student Services personnel, a game room and student lounge. Today, this house is known as Anderson House and is the base for the Office of Mission and Campus Ministries' activities.

Library 
The library collection consists of reserve, reference, general education, health sciences, and historical collections. E-books represent 66% of the library's book collection of over 34,000 titles. The professional journals are 99% electronic and total over 31,000 titles. Streaming videos represent 98% of the library's video collection that exceeds 40,000 titles. All library electronic resources are available with remote access 24/7.

April 2015, the library launched the Journal of Visualized Experiments, the world's first peer-reviewed scientific video journal devoted to publishing scientific research in a visual format. UpToDate, the nation's premier clinical decision online support tool, was added to the library collection with the launch of AHU's physician assistant program in May 2015.

Chapel 
The chapel is a quiet space for students, staff, and faculty.

Research 
To support research efforts, AHU through its Grants Management Committee, competitively awards Faculty Research Seed Grants in the Fall and Spring trimesters to qualified university faculty and faculty/student teams.

, AHU has two "centers of excellence" on campus to facilitate student and faculty research.

Center for Population Health Research (CPHR) 
The CPHR engages students and faculty in applying geographic information systems technologies to medical geography research, incorporating current projects already in progress at ADU. Students gain hands-on research experience while developing skills in spatial thinking, quantitative analysis, and problem solving.

Center for Advanced Ultrasound Education (CAUE) 
The CAUE expands on-going initiatives to provide opportunities for education beyond what is captured in current sonography programs at ADU. The center offers continuing education training for the ultrasound community in Central Florida, including emergency physician training and training for the Radiology Physician residency program at Florida Hospital. In addition, the center consolidates efforts of department faculty and their contributions to the ultrasound education community. In 2016, faculty provided:
Continuing education to over 90 radiology sonographers
Point of care ultrasound education to 12 Florida Hospital residents and fellows
Graduate classes in ultrasound education to about 50 students 
Presentations at national conferences and an international conference in Chile

Community engagement and humanitarianism 
Since 1999, members of AHU have participated in yearly mission trips, and all students receiving an undergraduate degree must complete a service-learning graduation requirement. In 2008, a mandatory service learning course was introduced to facilitate this goal.

AHU's Office of Community Engagement works with community partners to set up service learning projects and volunteer opportunities for students as well as faculty and staff. There is also the annual Service Day where faculty and staff gather to volunteer at a local community organization. The first annual Service Day took place on August 26, 2009, at the Primrose Center, a large facility in South Orlando serving the needs of the mentally and physically disabled people of Orange County.

The Community Engagement department organizes and hosts annual Summer Science Camps with a local branch of the Boys & Girls Clubs of America. The week-long, day camp is designed to teach middle school aged children the benefits of STEM (Science, Technology, Engineering, Math) education, health education, and health careers. The children participate in science workshops, field trips, and fitness and wellness workshops. In 2017, ADU brought kids participating in the camp to the Orlando Science Center for the day to enjoy interactive exhibits, live programming, and other educational activities.

Grace Fund 
University and Florida Hospital employees started the Grace Fund to help students with unexpected emergencies. In 2013, it was reported that more than $325,000 had been donated to the fund over the last decade. According to the 2015 – 2016 Annual Report, 78 students received help from the fund during that time period.

Hope Clinic 
In 2011, AHU established the HOPE (Healing through Occupation, Purpose and Excellence) Clinic in Orlando. In 2016, the Community Health Impact Council (CHiC) of Florida Hospital approved a grant for the clinic, enabling it to expand in size and impact. The newly improved Clinic is expected to open in 2019.

Community Health Transitional Care Internship 
AHU partnered with Florida Hospital to develop the Community Health Transitional Care Internship.

See also

 List of Seventh-day Adventist colleges and universities
 List of Seventh-day Adventist hospitals

References

External links
 

Universities and colleges in Orlando, Florida
Universities and colleges affiliated with the Seventh-day Adventist Church
Seventh-day Adventist universities and colleges in the United States
Nursing schools in Florida
Buildings and structures in Orlando, Florida
Educational institutions established in 1992
Universities and colleges accredited by the Southern Association of Colleges and Schools
1992 establishments in Florida
Private universities and colleges in Florida